Girl in Room 13 may refer to:
 Girl in Room 13 (1960 film), an American film
 Girl in Room 13 (2022 film), an American television film

See also
 The Woman in Room 13, a lost 1920 American silent mystery drama film